Jaime Alonso-Lasheras Rivero (born Valladolid, 29 April 1973) is a Spanish rugby union player. He plays as a scrum-half.

Career
His first international cap was during a match against Japan, at Tokyo, on August 29, 1999. He was part of the 1999 Rugby World Cup roster, playing the match against Uruguay, at Galashiels. His last international cap was during a match against USA, at Madrid, on April 12, 2003.

External links
 Jaime Alonso international statistics

1973 births
Living people
Sportspeople from Valladolid
Spanish rugby union players
Rugby union scrum-halves
Rugby union fullbacks
Spain international rugby union players